The Yantan Dam is a gravity dam on the Hongshui River near Dahua County, Guangxi China. The main purpose of the dam is hydroelectric power production and it has an associated 1,210 MW power station consisting of 4 x 302.5 MW Francis turbine-generators.

Construction
The dam was placed on the state key project list in 1984 and construction began in March 1985. By November 1987, the river was diverted and in March 1992, the dam began to impound the reservoir. On September 16, 1992, the first generator was operational nine months ahead of schedule. The second generator was operation in August 1993, the third in June 1994 and the fourth in June 1995. By the end of 1995, the entire project was complete. The dam is owned by Guangxi Electric Power Bureau while Guangxi Electricpower Investigation and Design Institute designed it and Guangxi Yantan Hydropower Project Construction Corporation constructed it. 43,176 people were relocated as a result of the project.

Design
The facility is composed of the dam, its power station and a ship lift. The power station is supported by four intakes, penstocks and tailraces. It contains 4 x 302.5 MW Francis turbines for an installed capacity of 1,210 but operates at a firm capacity of 242 MW. The Yantan Ship Lift is a vertical lift type designed for a maximum 250 ton barge vessel.

See also 
 List of power stations in China

External links

References

Hydroelectric power stations in Guangxi
Dams in China
Gravity dams
Dams completed in 1995